Luke Baines (born 8 June 1990) is an English-born Australian actor. He is best known for playing the serial killer in The Girl in the Photographs, the last film produced by Wes Craven, which opened at the 2015 Toronto International Film Festival. His major breakout role in TV was playing Jonathan Morgenstern in Shadowhunters.

Early life 
Born in Hyde, Greater Manchester, England, Baines grew up in the beach-side suburb of Cronulla, Sydney in Australia. He began acting lessons when he was five years old.

Baines attended The McDonald College of Performing Arts in North Strathfield, New South Wales where he studied drama, music and dance.

Career 
In 2008, Baines auditioned during a six-month nationwide casting search for the West End production of Spring Awakening the musical. In November of that year, he performed in the workshop at the Lyric Hammersmith in the role of Hanschen.

Notably, he appeared as a serial killer in the Wes Craven-produced film The Girl in the Photographs, which premiered in Midnight Madness at 2015 Toronto International Film Festival. The performance received critical praise from outlets such as The Wrap, The Line Up and Press Pass LA, who singled him out as a breakout star.

Baines has also appeared in Gold Circle Films' The Possession of Michael King, and Disney's Saving Mr. Banks.

In 2013, Baines starred in Richard Zelniker's As Night Comes (originally titled Mischief Night). The film follows troubled 17-year-old Sean Holloway (Myko Olivier) who falls in with a group of teenage outcasts called 'The Misfits,' whose charismatic and deeply dysfunctional leader, Ricky Gladstone (Baines), takes him under his wing.

Baines also appears in Mark Webber and Teresa Palmer's The Ever After. The independent feature stars Palmer, Weber, Melissa Leo, Phoebe Tonkin and Tahyna Tozzi. It was filmed in Los Angeles and New York between July and August 2013.

In 2016, Deadline Hollywood announced that Baines would be joining Andrew Garfield and Riley Keogh in David Robert Mitchell's Under the Silver Lake.

Baines has appeared in several TV shows, including Shadowhunters where he portrayed the reincarnated Jonathan Morgenstern, Clary's brother, in Season 3b. In 2020 he appeared as a Chronicom in one episode of Agents of S.H.I.E.L.D., and as an Imperial Shuttle Pilot in the Disney+ series The Mandalorian.

Baines co-wrote and starred in the upcoming horror comedy film Untitled Horror Movie, which was filmed remotely by the actors during the COVID-19 pandemic.

His stage highlights include Spring Awakening the Musical, Footloose the Musical and Alice's Adventures in Wonderland. As a model, he has appeared in advertisements and editorials for American Eagle, American Rag, Roark Collective and Chapter.

Personal life
Baines came out as part of the LGBT+ community in June of 2022. He said he was currently in a relationship with a man and previously been in a relationship with a woman.

Filmography

Film

Television

Stage 
 2004: The McDonald College 20th Anniversary concert
 2004: Footloose as Ren McCormack
 2007: Alice's Adventures in Wonderland as the Mad Hatter

References

External links 

Luke Baines Official website

British emigrants to Australia
Australian male television actors
Living people
Male actors from Sydney
People from Tameside (district)
1990 births
Australian LGBT actors